The 1970 USAC Championship Car season consisted of 18 races, beginning in Avondale, Arizona on March 28 and concluding at the same location on November 21.  There was also one non-championship event at Pikes Peak, Colorado.  The USAC National Champion and Indianapolis 500 winner was Al Unser.  After this season, dirt courses did not reappear in the USAC Championship until 1981-82. Road courses after this season did not reappear in the USAC Championship until 1977. The Pikes Peak Auto Hill Climb was the only non-championship event.

Schedule and results

 No pole is awarded for the Pikes Peak Hill Climb, in this schedule on the pole is the driver who started first. No lap led was awarded for the Pikes Peak Hill Climb, however, a lap was awarded to the drivers that completed the climb.
 Scheduled for 300 miles, stopped early due to rain.

Final points standings

Note: Mark Donohue, Kevin Bartlett, Peter Revson, LeeRoy Yarbrough, John Cannon, Donnie Allison, Ron Grable, Jack Eiteljorg and Jack Brabham are not eligible for points.

References
 
 
 
 http://media.indycar.com/pdf/2011/IICS_2011_Historical_Record_Book_INT6.pdf  (p. 232-237)

See also
 1970 Indianapolis 500

USAC Championship Car season
USAC Championship Car
1970 in American motorsport